Boom Boom Room were an English band which formed in 1985, comprising Andy Nakanza (vocals), Skid (drums), Inz (bass), and Lushi (rhythm guitar & bass). Lushi was also in a band called One the Juggler. They had one single in the UK Singles Chart, "Here Comes the Man", which entered the chart on 8 March 1986, and reached #74; it was in the chart for one week.

The song was later covered by The Parlotones, appearing on their EP Borderline Patrol in 2004, and their debut studio album, Radiocontrolledrobot, in 2005.

Discography

Albums
Stretch (1987, Epic)

Singles
"Here Comes the Man" (1986, Fun After All)
"Here Comes the Man" (1986, Epic)
"Take Your Time" (1986, Epic)
"Julie" (1987, Epic)
"Love Your Face" (1987, Epic)

References

External links
History of One the Juggler
Boom Boom Room on Myspace

English pop music groups
English new wave musical groups
Epic Records artists